The Chief of the Name, or in older English usage Captain of his Nation, is the recognised head of a family or clan (fine in Irish and Scottish Gaelic). The term has sometimes been used as a title in Ireland and Scotland.

In Ireland
In Elizabethan times, the position of Chief of the Name was more important to some Irish leaders than English titles. There are instances where Norman lords of the time like FitzGerald, took to using the Gaelic style of "The" or "Mór" (great) to indicate that the individual was the primary person of his family in Ireland. Chiefs were elected from their clan's "Derbfine", a group of cousins who were all at least the great-grandsons of former chiefs. 

In the Tudor period the Kingdom of Ireland was established in 1542, and many of the former autonomous clan chiefs were assimilated under the English legal system via the policy of surrender and regrant. At the same time mentions were made in official records of locally-powerful landlords described as "chief of his nation", i.e. head of a family, whether assimilated or not. Attempts were made by the English to make each "chief" responsible for the good behaviour of the rest of his family and followers. The Gaelic practice was for such a man to sign himself by the family surname only. A new practice arose where the English version of the surname was in many instances prefixed by "The", and so for example the head of the Mac Aonghusa clan in County Down would sign as "Mac Aonghusa" in Irish, and as "The Magennis" in English.

The downfall of the Gaelic order in the early 17th century led to a decline of the power of the chiefs. Plantation efforts, the wars of Cromwell and King James, meant that by the end of the 17th century, many of the Chiefships of the Name were living outside Ireland, reduced to poverty, or lost forever.

Thereafter, those former kings or chiefs who had been assimilated under the English legal system passed their titles down by primogeniture, whereas the usual Irish practice in the Middle Ages was to elect a chief from a group of close cousins known as a derbfine. Some chiefs did not assimilate under the English legal system, but relied on the system of succession provided for under Irish Brehon Law. The lineages of assimilated chiefs were usually recorded by the Herald's Office in Dublin Castle, set up in 1552, not least because many clans in the 16th and 17th centuries had been persuaded to enter the English-law system under the policy of surrender and regrant. Other manuscript genealogies were preserved and published in the 18th century by Charles O'Conor and Sylvester O'Halloran. The Irish nationalist and republican movements that developed after 1850 often harked back emotively to the former chiefs' losses, but without ever suggesting that they be reinstated.

1922–2003

The Irish Free State, founded in 1922, gave no special recognition to the concept, but in 1938, the then Taoiseach, Éamon de Valera, at the inauguration of Dr. Douglas Hyde as the first President of Ireland, welcomed the incoming President with these words: "In you we greet the successor of our rightful princes and in your accession to office we hail the closing of the breach that has existed since the undoing of our nation at Kinsale". In 1948 the government suggested that there should be a "Council" of chiefs, accredited by the Herald, for emotive reasons. In Irish and English law a title is a possession, classed as an "incorporeal hereditament", but the 1937 Irish Constitution forbids the conferring of titles of nobility by the state, as well as the acceptance of titles of nobility or honour without the prior permission of the government. Therefore, the Council was also a means of allowing them to use their titles, but only as honorifics and without any political function. In 1943 the Taoiseach (Irish Prime Minister) agreed with Edward McLysaght, then Chief Herald of Ireland, that the titles would be known as "designations" made by the Herald's Office to avoid the constitutional ban. McLysaght deplored that anyone could perfectly legally describe themselves as "chief of the name" (such as The O'Rahilly) without having any written proof of descent, if nobody else claimed the very same title.

Effectively a dual system ran from 1948 to 2003, where the government recognised the chiefs as such, but not their other titles. In such a case, for example, The McDermot, Prince of Coolavin would only be known as "The McDermot" to the Chief Herald, but would be addressed also as "Prince of Coolavin" by his fellow chiefs.

Until 2003, an Irish "Chief of the Name" was a person recognised by the Chief Herald of Ireland as the most senior known male descendant of the last inaugurated or de facto chief of that name in power in Gaelic Ireland at or before the end of the 16th century. The practice was discontinued in 2003 owing to the "MacCarthy Mór" fraud (below).

Abandonment: the MacCarthy Mór scandal
After genealogical errors in the 1990s saw Terence Francis MacCarthy and other impostors receive recognition, the Irish government decided in July 2003 to abandon this practice. This was partly because of concern that there was no proper legal basis for it. As this concern was backed by an opinion of the Attorney General, in 2003 the Genealogical Office discontinued the practice of recognising Chiefs. This decision was a cause for concern among the recognised chiefs.

Some modern Irish clan organisations have elected honorary chieftains, where no Chief of the Name is known or yet to be proven. There have been some articles advocating the adoption of a modification of the Scottish 'Ad Hoc Derbhfine' approach to the election of new chiefs where the descents from the last chief have been lost to history or not verifiable. Some re-formed Irish clans are affiliated with the Finte na hÉireann or Clans of Ireland, an organisation established in 1989 to maintain a register of affiliated Irish clans.

Present Irish law
As the law has reverted to the pre-1943 situation, anyone can call himself a Chief of the Name without any historical basis for such a claim. A 2009 example is the Clan Cian web page (see below), which includes: "Clan Cian is Headed by the recognized Ard Tiarna. F.J. O'Carroll, of Eile O'Carroll, Chief of Name".

Gaelic Irish titles 
In 1896, Jorge O'Neill of Portugal submitted his genealogy to the Somerset Herald in London.  Five years later, Sir Henry Farnham Burke, KCVO, CB, FSA, Somerset Herald stated in 1900 that "the only Pedigree at present on record in either of the Offices of Arms showing a lineal male descent from the House of O'Neill, Monarchs of Ireland, Kings of Ulster, and Princes of Tyrone and Claneboy, is the one registered in the fifty-ninth year of the Reign of Our Sovereign Lady Victoria, in favor of His Excellency Jorge O'Neill of Lisbon". He then recognised him as the Representative of the House of O'Neill and as the Representative of the Earldom created in 1542 for his kinsman Conn Baccagh O'Neill.  All of this was granted under Letters Patent issued by the English College of Heralds.  Later, the Ulster and Norroy King of Arms granted him the undifferenced arms as the head of the House of O'Neill.  Upon that Letters Patent, Pope Leo XIII, the King of Spain, and the King of Portugal recognised Jorge O'Neill as the Prince of Clanaboy, Tyrone, Ulster, as the Count of Tyrone, and the Head of the Royal House of O'Neill and all of its septs.   The grandson of Jorge and present Prince of Clanaboy, Hugo, has not pressed his senior claim to the entire House of O'Neill out of respect for his O'Neill chief cousins and their own histories.

In Scotland

In general, the same pattern holds true of the clan chiefs in Scotland as for chiefs in Ireland. Titles may vary, but a chief of a clan is still the recognised leader within a Scottish clan. A difference is that in Scotland clan chiefs can be either male or female whereas in Ireland the clan chiefs are invariably male. In Scotland it is the Standing Council of Scottish Chiefs; in Ireland it is the Standing Council of Irish Chiefs and Chieftains. In Scotland there exists an 'Ad Hoc Derbhfine' approach to the selection of a new chiefly family when it has been determined that no verifiable descent from a former chief exists.  Some have advocated that a similar approach be used in Ireland where chiefships have been lost to history.

See also
 Donal II O'Donovan, a notable historical case
 White Rod
 Irish name

References

Further reading
 Burkes Peerage: See Irish and Scottish Chiefs; Peerages; and Titles
 Ellis, Peter Berresford, Erin's Blood Royal: The Gaelic Noble Dynasties of Ireland. Palgrave. Revised edition, 2002.
 Kingdom of Desmond Association 'Irish Chiefly Succession: "Ad Hoc Derbhfine Guildlines"' on Clan MacCarthy Foundation website and in AWEN, Journal of the Noble Society of Celts, 2014.
 Murphy, Sean J (2004) Twilight of the Chiefs: The Mac Carthy Mór Hoax. Bethesda, Maryland: Academica Press. .
 MacLysaght, Edward (1996) More Irish Families. Dublin, Ireland: Irish Academic Press. .
 Nicholls, K.W. Gaelic and Gaelicized Ireland in the Middle Ages Dublin, Lilliput Press, 2003. .
 Vanishing Kingdoms – The Irish Chiefs and Their Families, by Walter J. P. Curley (former US Ambassador to Ireland), with foreword by Charles Lysaght, published by The Lilliput Press, Dublin, 2004.  & . (Chapter on O'Donnell of Tyrconnell, page 59).
 Nash, Professor C., Of Irish Descent, chapter 4. New York, Syracuse University Press, 2008.

External links
Clans of Ireland
Clans and Chieftains in Ireland From More Irish Families by Edward MacLysaght, First Chief Herald of Ireland
List of Scottish Chiefs and Clans
Sean Murphy's website on the subject
Article on Irish Chiefs on the Burke's Peerage & Gentry website 
Irish Chiefs at The Doyle Page (Australia)

Social history of Ireland
Social history of Scotland
Ancient Irish dynasties
Gaelic nobility of Ireland